Nodavirus endopeptidase (Black Beetle virus endopeptidase, Flock House virus endopeptidase) is an enzyme. This enzyme catalyses the following chemical reaction

 Hydrolysis of an asparaginyl bond involved in the maturation of the structural protein of the virus, typically -Asn-Ala- or -Asn-Phe-

The enzyme is coded by several nodaviruses that are insect pathogens.

References

External links 
 

EC 3.4.23